Richard Colebrook Harris  (July 4, 1936 – September 26, 2022), better known as Cole Harris, was a Canadian geographer and university professor.

Education
Harris received a Bachelor of Arts degree (1958) from the University of British Columbia, a Master of Science degree (1962), and a Ph.D. (1964) from the University of Wisconsin–Madison.

Personal life and death
In 1964 Harris joined the University of Toronto as an Assistant Professor, and became an Associate Professor in 1971. Later that year he joined the University of British Columbia as an Associate Professor, and became a Professor at that university in 1973. 

Harris died at home on September 26, 2022, at the age of 86.

Awards
Harris was made a Fellow of the Royal Society of Canada in 1982. The Royal Canadian Geographical Society awarded Harris a Gold Medal in 1988, and awarded him the Massey Medal in 2003. Harris was made an Officer of the Order of Canada in 2004.

Selected publications
The Seigneurial System in Early Canada: A Geographical Study - 1966
Canada Before Confederation: A Study in Historical Geography - 1974 (edited with John Warkentin)
Letters from Windermere, 1912-1914 -  1984  (edited with Elizabeth Phillips)
Historical Atlas of Canada, vol. I: From the Beginning to 1800 - 1987
The Resettlement of British Columbia: Essays on Colonialism and Geographical Change - 1997
Making Native Space: Colonialism, Resistance, and Reserves in British Columbia - 2003 (nominated for the Hubert Evans Non-Fiction Prize)
The Reluctant Land:  Society, Space, and Environment in Canada before Confederation - 2009

References

1936 births
2022 deaths
Canadian geographers
Historical geographers
Canadian non-fiction writers
Fellows of the Royal Society of Canada
Officers of the Order of Canada
University of British Columbia alumni
Academic staff of the University of British Columbia
Academic staff of the University of Toronto
University of Wisconsin–Madison alumni
Writers from Vancouver
Massey Medal recipients